Arnobius (died c. 330) was an early Christian apologist of Berber origin during the reign of Diocletian (284–305). 

According to Jerome's Chronicle, Arnobius, before his conversion, was a distinguished Numidian rhetorician at Sicca Veneria (El Kef, Tunisia), a major Christian center in Proconsular Africa, and owed his conversion to a premonitory dream. Arnobius writes dismissively of dreams in his surviving book, so perhaps Jerome was projecting his own respect for the content of dreams. 

According to Jerome, to overcome the doubts of the local bishop as to the earnestness of his Christian belief he wrote (c. 303, from evidence in IV:36) an apologetic work in seven books that St. Jerome calls Adversus gentes but which is entitled Adversus nationes in the only (9th-century) manuscript that has survived. Jerome's reference, his remark that Lactantius was a pupil of Arnobius and the surviving treatise are all that we know about Arnobius.

Adversus nationes
Adversus nationes (Against the Pagans) was composed in response to Diocletian's persecution of Christians, and was a rebuttal to Pagan arguments as to why the persecution was justifiable.  Arnobius, "a practitioner of the turgid and coarse style that is called African", is a vigorous apologist for the Christian faith, more earnest in his defence of Christianity than perfectly orthodox in his tenets. His book has been occasioned by complaints that the Christians had brought the wrath of the gods on Ancient Rome. Thus, he holds the heathen gods to be real beings, but subordinate to the supreme Christian God; in a streak of gnosticism, he affirms that the human soul (Book II, 14 - 62) is not the work of God, but of an intermediate being, and is not immortal by nature, but capable of putting on immortality as a grace. He even says that a belief in the soul's immortality would tend to remove moral restraint, and have a prejudicial effect on human life. Never specifically identifying his pagan adversaries, some of whom may be straw men, set up to be demolished, Arnobius defends and expounds the rightness of monotheism and Christianity (deus princeps, deus summus) and the divinity of Christ, by adducing its rapid diffusion, its influence in civilizing barbarians and its consonance with the best philosophy. Christianizing Plato, he refutes pagan idolatry as filled with contradictions and openly immoral, and to demonstrate this point, his Books III through V abound with curious information gathered from reliable sources (e.g. Cornelius Labeo) concerning the forms of idolatrous worship, temples, idols, and the Graeco-Roman cult practice of his time, to the historian and mythographer's cautious delight, but all held up by Arnobius for Christian ridicule. Books VI and VII handle the questions of sacrifices and worship of images.

In book 2 section 4 of Adversus nationes, Arnobius gives the first known version of the argument later called Pascal's Wager, that in case of doubt about religion one should commit to it because of the rewards of doing so and risks of  not doing so. He argues:

The work of Arnobius appears to have been written when he was a recent convert, for he does not possess a very extensive knowledge of Scripture. He knows nothing of the Old Testament, and only the life of Christ in the New, while he does not quote directly from the Gospels. He was much influenced by Lucretius and had read Plato. His statements concerning Greek and Roman mythology are based respectively on the Protrepticus of Clement of Alexandria, and on Cornelius Labeo, who belonged to the preceding generation and attempted to restore Neoplatonism.

Adversus nationes survived in a single ninth-century manuscript in Paris (and a bad copy of it in Brussels). The French manuscript also contains the Octavius of Marcus Minucius Felix.

Notes

Citations

References
 (draws extensively on Arnobius)
 

 The only modern study.

External links

Opera Omnia by Migne Patrologia Latina with analytical indexes
Editio princeps: Disputationum adversus gentes libri VIII : Nunc primum in lucem editi, Rome, 1542,  Online at the Bavarian State Library. With the Octavius of Minucius Felix as liber octavus .

4th-century Berber people
330 deaths
Post–Silver Age Latin writers
Ancient Roman writers
Christian writers
Christian apologists
4th-century Christians
Annihilationists
Year of birth unknown
Berber Christians
4th-century Latin writers